George Townshend, 2nd Marquess Townshend, PC, FRS (18 April 1753 – 27 July 1811), known as The Lord Ferrers of Chartley from 1770 to 1784 and as The Earl of Leicester from 1784 to 1807, was a British peer and politician.

Background and education
Townshend was the eldest son of George Townshend, 1st Marquess Townshend, by his first wife Charlotte Compton, 16th Baroness Ferrers of Chartley and 7th Baroness Compton. He was the elder brother of Lord John Townshend and Lord Charles Townshend and the nephew of Charles Townshend. He succeeded to the titles held by his mother on her death in 1774 and became known as the Lord Ferrers of Chartley. He was educated at Eton and St John's College, Cambridge, and served for a few years in the Army, achieving the ranks of Cornet, Lieutenant, and finally Captain in 1774.

Political career
Townshend received his writ of summons to the House of Lords in 1774. In March 1782 he was appointed Captain of the Honourable Band of Gentlemen Pensioners, a position he held until May 1783, and again from December 1783 to 1797. He was admitted to the Privy Council in April 1782 and also served as a member of the Committee for Trade from 1784 to 1786. In 1784 he was created Earl of Leicester in his own right. His choice of title derived from the fact that he was a female-line great-great-great-grandson of Lady Lucy Sydney, daughter of Robert Sidney, 2nd Earl of Leicester (a title which had become extinct in 1743). He later held office under William Pitt the Younger and Henry Addington as Master of the Mint from 1790 to 1794, as Joint Postmaster General from 1794 to 1799 and as Lord Steward of the Household from 1799 to 1802. In 1807 he succeeded his father in the marquessate of Townshend.

Apart from his political career, Townshend was interested in archaeology and served as President of the Society of Antiquaries. He was also a Fellow of the Royal Society and a Trustee of the British Museum.

Family

Lord Townshend married Charlotte, daughter of Eaton Mainwaring-Ellerker, on 24 December 1777, who had adopted the name and arms of Ellerker by a 1750 Act of Parliament. They had two sons, George and Lord Charles, both of whom died childless, and three daughters. She died in February 1802. Lord Townshend died suddenly in July 1811, aged 58, and was succeeded in his titles by his eldest son George, who had previously been disinherited. On the latter's death in 1855 the earldom of Leicester became extinct while the marquessate passed to his cousin John Townshend, son of Lord John Townshend of Balls Park.

References

External links

|-

1753 births
1811 deaths
18th-century English nobility
19th-century English nobility
02
1st Earl of Leicester
08
17
Masters of the Mint
Members of the Privy Council of Great Britain
Fellows of the Royal Society
Fellows of the Society of Antiquaries of London
Presidents of the Society of Antiquaries of London
Trustees of the British Museum
George Townshend
Honourable Corps of Gentlemen at Arms
United Kingdom Postmasters General
Alumni of St John's College, Cambridge
People educated at Eton College